The Arado E.583 (Arado Ar P.I ) was a project design from 1945 for a jet-powered night fighter aircraft of the German manufacturer Arado Flugzeugwerke.

History
The design of the E.583 goes back to the E.581, an earlier project by Arado, in which design variants for a single-beam, tailless night fighter were also examined. The starting point for the E.581 was again the studies in connection with the project E.555 for a multi-beam long-range bomber. However, due to the long inlet and the large hull surface, the Heinkel HeS-011 jet engine of the E.581, which was integrated into the fuselage, could only expect inadequate performance in the high-speed sector.

Arado then created two new project designs in accordance with the guidelines issued in January 1945 for the optimal solution of a night fighter. Under the overall designation E.583, the studies Ar-I and Ar-II - also referred to as Project I and II - were presented at the same time.

The Ar-I was based on the draft E.581-5, but had much larger dimensions. The experts criticized on 20./21. March 1945 again the resistance generating engine intakes and large surfaces. Arado then improved the design so that a third crew member and a larger amount of fuel could be included. A third variant received smaller and more swept wings. Allegedly, it is said to have served as inspiration for the US Vought F7U-3 Cutlass. However, head of the aerodynamic research department of Vought, William C. Schoolfield, denied that any orientation towards German research has taken place. 

The Ar-II was regarded as an easier to implement night fighter. The design had swept wings and was strongly based on the Arado Ar 234 and the study TEW 16 / 43-23. The maximum speed was calculated at 775 km / h, lower than that of the Ar-I.

Construction
The Ar I was designed as a tailless aircraft, in which the ailerons also served as horizontal stabilizer. The two rudders were each placed on top of the wings.

Technical data

See also
List of aircraft types

References

World War II fighter aircraft
twinjets
Arado aircraft
Abandoned military aircraft projects of Germany
World War II jet aircraft of Germany
Flying wings